Umm Badr  is a town  in North Kurdufan in  Sudan at an altitude of 691 meters above sea level (2270 feet).  It  lies at distance of about 319 kilometers (198 miles) west to the capital Khartoum.

Umm Badr is located on the shores of a seasonal lake known as the Lake of Umm Badr, midway from Khartoum to El Fasher.  The town is a major center for the Kewahla, one of the major tribes in Sudan, and is rich in natural resources and mineral  such as gold.

The town is accommodated with one rural hospital. The nearest international airport is in El-Obeid city some 237 kilometers (169 miles) away. There is no railway connections to the town, but some roads are to be found which lead to many major neighboring cities such as Al Nuhud, Hamrat El Sheik, Barah and El-Obeid. 

The topography of the area is dominated by seasonal wadis and small scattered high rocky mountains, hills and dunes of red sands as well as seasonal vegetation around the wadis during the rainy season. Recently a dam construction has been built to impound rain water. Lake Umm Badr is the main water surface feature in the area.

Dr. Kurt Beck, a German anthropologist and Professor in Bayreuth International School of African Studies, University of  Bayreuth, has settled in Umm Badr for a long time.  The  British explorer and writer  Michael Asher, author of  A Desert Dies, lived in Umm Badr for some years  among the Kewahla Arab nomadic and pastoral tribe who roam the desert and the savanna regions in the area.

References 

Populated places in North Kurdufan